Travis is mainly an English masculine given name of French origin. It is derived from the word "traverser" or "to cross", and was given to toll collectors who stood by a bridge or crossing.

People
Travis Alexander (1977-2008), American salesman who was murdered by his ex-girlfriend
Travis Banton (1894–1958), American costume designer
Travis Barker (born 1975), American drummer for the rock band Blink-182
Travis Beacham (born 1980), American screenwriter
Travis Best (born 1972), American basketball player
Travis Blankenhorn (born 1996), American baseball player
Travis Boak (born 1988) Australian rules footballer 
Travis Brody (born 1984), professional American football quarterback
Travis Brown (cyclist) (born 1969), American cyclist
Travis Brown (quarterback) (born 1977), former American football quarterback
Travis Brown (wide receiver) (born 1986), American football wide receiver
Travis Browne (born 1982), American mixed martial artist
Travis Clark (born 1985), American musician
Travis Chapman (born 1978), American baseball player and coach
Travis Childers (born 1958), former U.S. representative from Mississippi
Travis Coleman (born 1980), American football player
Travis d'Arnaud (born 1989), American baseball player
Travis Demeritte (born 1994), American baseball player
Travis Dermott (born 1996), National Hockey League player
Travis Elborough (born 1971), British author
Travis Etienne (born 1999), American football player
Travis Feeney (born 1992), American football player
Travis Fimmel (born 1979), Australian model and actor 
Travis Fulgham (born 1995), American football player
Travis Greene (born 1984), American gospel singer
Travis Haley, (known as Lexxi Foxxx) American bass player for the rock band Steel Panther
Travis Hamonic (born 1990), professional ice hockey player
Travis Head (born 1993), Australian cricketer
Travis Henry (born 1978), American football running back
Travis Homer (born 1998), American football player
Travis Ishikawa (born 1983), American baseball player
Travis Jankowski (born 1991), American baseball player
Travis Johnstone (born 1980), Australian rules footballer
Travis Kelce (born 1989), American football tight end
Travis Konecny (born 1997), Canadian hockey forward
Travis Kvapil (born 1976), American former NASCAR driver
Travis Lakins Sr. (born 1994), American baseball player
Travis Lanier (born 1991), Philanthropist
Travis Ludlow (born 2003), English aviator
Travis Lutter (born 1973), American mixed martial artist
Travis Marx (born 1977), American mixed martial artist
Travis McCoy (born 1981), musician and singer
Travis McElroy (born 1983), American podcaster
Travis Meeks (born 1979), lead singer, guitarist and songwriter for acoustic rock band Days of the New
Travis Pastrana (born 1983), American motorsports athlete
Travis Pearson (born 1971), American football player
Travis Reed (born 1979), American basketball player
Travis Rinker (born 1968), American association football (soccer) player
Travis Scott (born 1991), American rapper
Travis Shaw (born 1990), American baseball player
Travis Sinniah, admiral, commander of the Sri Lanka Navy from August to October 2017
Travis Swaggerty (born 1997), American baseball player
Travis Tritt (born 1963), American country musician
Travis Wall (born 1987), contemporary dance teacher 
Travis Walton (born 1953), an American alleged alien abductee 
Travis Warech (born 1991), American-German-Israeli basketball player for Israeli team Hapoel Be'er Sheva
Travis Wear (born 1990), American basketball player
Travis Willingham (born 1981), American voice actor 
Travis Wilson (wide receiver) (born 1984), American football wide receiver
Travis Zajac (born 1985), Canadian National Hockey League player

Fictional characters
Travis Bell, a character in Killer7
Travis Bickle, protagonist of the film Taxi Driver
 Travis Coates, in the novel Old Yeller and its Disney film adaptation 
 Travis Fields, the protagonist of Oddity
 Travis Harris, protagonist of the novel Taming the Star Runner by S.E. Hinton
 Travis Henderson, protagonist of the film Paris, Texas, by Wim Wenders
 Travis Maddox, protagonist of the novel Beautiful Disaster by Jamie McGuire
Travis Mayweather, in the American TV series Star Trek: Enterprise
Travis McGee, created by John D. MacDonald
Travis Nash, from the Australian soap opera Home and Away
 Travis Strong, one of the main characters from the Canadian TV series Radio Free Roscoe
Travis Touchdown, the main character in the No More Heroes series
Travis Tractor, a character from the British children's series Bob the Builder
Travis, antagonist of the British TV series Blake's 7

References 

English masculine given names
Masculine given names
English given names